Thomas Newcomen was an English inventor.

Thomas Newcomen can also refer to:

Sir Thomas Newcomen, 5th Baronet
Thomas Newcomen (MP for St Johnstown)
Sir Thomas Newcomen, 8th Baronet